Nye is an unincorporated community in Stillwater County, Montana, United States. As of 2010, the population was 272.

Demographics

History
Originally a copper mining camp, the town sprang into existence when Jack Nye and the Hedges brothers staked their claim. Mining continues to be an important part of the area's economy. Nye's first post office was established on October 6, 1887, with Thomas Ross as its first postmaster. The post office is a contract post office and serves a large land area including all residents beyond the building at 2027 Nye Road (Carters Camp).

The Minnesota Mining and Smelting Company built a copper smelter here in 1889, but it was shut down when it was discovered that they were illegally on the Crow Indian Reservation. Mining resumed after the reservation boundary moved in 1890.

Nye was affected by the 2022 Montana floods when the Stillwater River flooded.

Climate
The climatic type is dominated by the winter season, a long, bitterly cold period with short, clear days, relatively little precipitation mostly in the form of snow, and low humidity. The Köppen Climate Classification subtype for this climate is "Dfc" (Continental Subarctic Climate).

References

Billings metropolitan area
Unincorporated communities in Stillwater County, Montana
Unincorporated communities in Montana